Ikom is a Local Government Area of Cross River State, Nigeria.
 

The people of Ikom are mostly farmers. Ikom is a major producer of bananas and plantains for the Nigerian market.

Ikom is known for the Afi monoliths, artifacts that bear an ancient writing sometimes taken to be an early form of nsibidi.

The postal code of the area is 551.

Ikom Local Government is in the Central Senatorial District of Cross River State.

There are 11 (eleven) council wards:
 Abanyum
 Yala-Nkum
 Olulumo
 Ofutop I
 Ofutop II
 Nta/Nselle
 Nde
 Abijinkpor
 Ikom Urban
 Akparabong
 Nnam

The present geographical entity called Ikom local government area dates back to the 16th century during the pre-colonial era when the area extended to some communities now enclosed in Boki Obubra, Abi and Etung local government areas. Like other typical traditional societies, Ikom was governed by Chief priests or Village heads who were both ceremonial and religious.

Modern day Ikom began as a constituent part of the Afikpo Division in the early 1950s when it was together with Afikpo now in Ebonyi State And in 1976, Ikom local government was created with headquarters at Ikom.

Ikom with a large size of 1,861.926 square kilometers is bounded on the North by Ogoja on the North-East by Boki, on the East by Etung Local Government and South by Obubra Local Government Area.

The major languages of the people include Ofutop Bakor, Yala, Mbembe and Ejagham. Ikom people are said to have originated from Bantu stock and their major occupation include farming trading and lumbering.

Tourism
In Ikom, the relics of early European traders, who transacted business along the Cross River Coast in Okangha, Abaragba, Okundi and Ikom urban, are still very much on the ground. These include the ancient architectural structures, which served as their residence and offices.

Similarly, the Ikom Town Beach is a tourist delight and any day, located about four kilometers from the Ikom local government headquarters. The dandy beach serves as a relaxation spot for fun-seekers.

Another remarkable tourist attraction is the Alok and Nkarasi, where carved monoliths are sited. The monoliths, also found in Nta-Nsellei Akaju, Abanyou, and Nde, are made from either basalt or limestone. The Nta and Nselle people call the a carved monoliths “Akwanshi” meaning “dead person on ground” while others refer to it as “atal” meaning “the stones” These historical artifacts consist of a number of groves containing circles of stones carved in low relief in a variety of human figures, with an annual festival held in the groves (play ground) at the end of every dry season.

Culture
According to historical facts, the slave trade brought about social disruption to Ikom such that it now broke into different independent units left to attend individually to their needs, including defence. But one thing that is common among them is their reverence for traditional institutions and their accessories as symbolized by deities, dance, festivals, Folk love and so on.

Investment opportunities and potential
Just like the then groundnut pyramid in Kano, there is a pyramid in Ikom local government area that has stoutly refused to diminish or disappear altogether – this pyramid is the "cocoa pyramid". Cocoa is the mainstay of the economy of Ikom local government area, which ranks among the highest producers of quality cocoa in the country. According to statistics from the Cross River State Ministry of Agriculture headquarters in Calabar, Ikom has a total planted area of 1,917 hectares of cocoa in its estates. Presently, there is no cocoa processing industry in Ikom to process abundant cocoa beans produced here.

Forest resources, coming in various names, shapes and colours, are also in abundance in Ikom awaiting exploitation as lumbering activities in the area are still relatively low and serve the small and medium scale woodwork furniture and carpentry works.

Prominent among the forest resources in Ikom are mahogany, iroko, aphoria (black and white) opepe, Obeche, teak, mangrove and Ebong. Investors are trickling into and seize the opportunity to set up wood based furniture industries to process the products into finished goods for local consumption and even for export. Besides, Ikom forest has a wide variety of animals facing the threat of extinction. These include monkeys, leopards and bush pigs etc.

Minerals
In addition to the agricultural products, commonly found in the area are salt brine deposits at akparabong. These deposits are commercially viable for large scale exploitation. Baryte is also found in Ekukunela (Ofutop) in commercial quantity, unexploited.

Production of foodstuff
Ikom is endowed with soil that not only accommodates the growth of cocoa but generously produces fine succulent plantain and banana. Yam, maize and coco-yam are also grown there in large quantities. These products are often taken from there to the northern parts of the country, to Calabar as well as to other eastern states.

Ikom in the news
In March 2021, 7000 metric tonnes of cocoa beans was transported from the ECM terminal at the Calabar seaport in Cross River State, South-South Nigeria to the United States of America. The cocoa beans were sourced 100 percent from Ikom. This marked a turning point for Cross River's states export industry.

See also
Ikom monoliths
Agbokim waterfalls

References

Local Government Areas in Cross River State